Two ships of the Royal Navy have been named HMS Cornflower :

 , an  sloop launched in 1916 and broken up in 1940
 HMS Cornflower (1940), a river steamer launched in 1927, originally SS Tai Hing, lost in 1941
 , was an  laid down as HMCS Hespeler but renamed Lysander on transfer to the Royal Navy in 1943. She was renamed Cornflower in 1950 and broken up in 1957

Royal Navy ship names